Hu Jintao (born 21 December 1942) is a Chinese politician who served as the general secretary of the Chinese Communist Party (CCP) from 2002 to 2012, the president of China from 2003 to 2013, and chairman of the Central Military Commission (CMC) from 2004 to 2012. He was a member of the CCP Politburo Standing Committee, China's de facto top decision-making body, from 1992 to 2012. Hu was the paramount leader of China from 2002 to 2012.

Hu rose to power through the Chinese Communist Party (CCP), notably as Party Committee secretary for Guizhou province and the Tibet Autonomous Region, where his harsh repression of dissent gained him attention from the highest levels. He moved up to first secretary of the CCP Central Secretariat and vice president under CCP general secretary Jiang Zemin. Hu was the first leader of the Communist Party from a generation younger than those who participated in the civil war and the founding of the republic. Influential sponsors from the older generation promoted his rapid rise, including Song Ping, Hu Yaobang, Deng Xiaoping, and Jiang Zemin.

During his term in office, Hu reintroduced state control in some sectors of the economy that were relaxed by the previous administration, and was conservative with political reforms. Along with his colleague Chinese premier Wen Jiabao, Hu presided over nearly a decade of consistent economic growth and development that cemented China as a major world power. He sought to improve socio-economic equality domestically through the Scientific Outlook on Development, which aimed to build a "Harmonious Socialist Society" that was prosperous and free of social conflict. Under his leadership, the authorities also cracked down on social disturbances, ethnic minority protests, and dissident figures, which also led to many controversial events such as the unrest in Tibet and the passing of the Anti-Secession Law. In foreign policy, Hu advocated for "China's peaceful development", pursuing soft power in international relations and a corporate approach to diplomacy. Throughout Hu's tenure, China's influence in Africa, Latin America, and other developing regions increased.

Hu possessed a modest and reserved leadership style. His tenure was characterized by collective leadership and consensus-based rule. These traits made Hu a rather enigmatic figure in the public eye. His administration was known for its focus more on technocratic competence than persona. At the end of his tenure after ten years in office, Hu won praise for retiring voluntarily from all positions. He was succeeded by Xi Jinping.

Following the death of his predecessor Jiang Zemin, Hu is the only living former paramount leader of the People's Republic of China.

Early life, education, and family

Hu Jintao was born on 21 December 1942 in Tai County, Jiangsu province, which was under Japanese occupation at the time. He is a direct descendant of the Ming dynasty general Hu Zongxian, known for fighting Japanese pirates. His branch of the family migrated from Jixi County, Anhui to Taizhou during his grandfather's generation. Though his father owned a small tea trading business in Taizhou, the family was relatively poor. His mother was a teacher and died when he was 7, and he was raised by an aunt. Hu's father was denounced during the Cultural Revolution, an event that (together with his relatively humble origins) apparently had a deep effect upon Hu, who diligently tried to clear his father's name.

He joined the Chinese Communist Party (CCP) in April 1964. That year he graduated from Tsinghua University after studying hub hydropower stations at the Water Conservancy Engineering Department. He began working in July 1965 as an engineer.

In 1968, Hu volunteered for his service in Gansu and worked on the construction of Liujiaxia Hydroelectric Station while also managing CCP affairs for the local branch of the Ministry of Water Resources and Electric Power. From 1969 to 1974, he worked for Sinohydro Engineering Bureau.

Hu is married to Liu Yongqing, whom he met at Tsinghua University when they were studying there. They have two children together, Hu Haifeng and Hu Haiqing. Unlike Wen Jiabao, the premier, he never granted a public one-on-one interview with the media.
He has been noted for his liking of table tennis and ballroom dancing.
Hu is also said to possess a photographic memory that became evident in his high school days.

Early political career
In 1973, Hu was transferred to the Construction Department of Gansu as a secretary. The next year he was promoted to deputy senior party secretary. In 1980, Deng Xiaoping implemented the "Four Transformations" program, which aimed to produce communist leaders who were "more revolutionary, younger, more knowledgeable, and more specialized." In response to this nationwide search for young party members, Song Ping, the first secretary of CCP Gansu Committee (Gansu's governor) discovered Hu Jintao and promoted him several ranks to the position of deputy head of the commission. Another protégé of Song, Wen Jiabao, also became prominent at the same time.

In 1982, Hu was promoted to the position of Communist Youth League Gansu Branch secretary and was appointed as the director of the All-China Youth Federation. His mentor, Song Ping, was transferred to Beijing as Minister of Organization of the Chinese Communist Party, and was in charge of senior cadres' recommendation, candidacy and promotion. With the support of Hu Yaobang (no relation) and Deng Xiaoping, Hu was assured of a bright future in the party. At Song Ping's suggestion, in 1982 central CCP authorities invited Hu to Beijing to study at the Central Party School. Soon after, he was transferred to Beijing and appointed to a position in the secretariat of the Communist Youth League Central Committee ("CY Central"). Two years later Hu was promoted to first secretary of CY Central, thus its actual leader. During his term in the Youth League, Hu escorted Hu Yaobang, who was CCP general secretary then, in visits around the country. Hu Yaobang, himself a veteran coming from the Youth League, could reminiscence his youth through Hu's company.

Leading the party in Guizhou
In 1985, Communist Party general secretary Hu Yaobang pushed for Hu Jintao to be transferred to Guizhou as the provincial Committee secretary of the Chinese Communist Party. Hu attempted to improve the economy of the backwater province, and reputedly visited all of its eighty-six counties. While in Guizhou, Hu was careful to follow Beijing's directives and had a reputation of being "airtight"; he rarely would offer his views on policy matters in public. While Hu was generally seen as an official with integrity and honesty, some locals preferred his predecessor Zhu Houze. In 1987, Hu Jintao handled the local students protest parallel to the Democracy Wall carefully, whereas in Beijing similar protests resulted in Hu Yaobang's forced resignation.

Tenure in Tibet
Hu Yaobang was purged by Deng Xiaoping in 1987 due to his 'liberal' tendencies, and his departure from the political scene was initially seen as unfavourable towards Hu Jintao, who drew criticism from party elders for failing to criticize the ousted reformer. In 1988, Hu Jintao was transferred to become Party Regional Committee secretary of the Tibetan Autonomous Region, while also taking on the role of Political Commissar of the local People's Liberation Army units. This made Hu effectively the number-one figure in the vast, restive region. A number of Tibetans have long been opposed to government policy in the region. Unrest and ethnic conflict were brewing, particularly anti-Han sentiments among segments of ethnic Tibetan society. Minor clashes had been occurring since 1987, and when the scale of unrest grew, Hu responded with the deployment of some 1,700 People's Armed Police into Lhasa in February 1989 in an attempt to warn against further disturbance. Increased clashes culminated in serious rioting in Lhasa's core on 5 March 1989, five days before the 30th anniversary of the 1959 Tibetan uprising. What occurred after is a matter of dispute. Rioters accused the police of shooting them arbitrarily, and the police claimed that they had acted in self-defense. In addition, there was speculation that Hu delayed his orders to clamp down on the protesters until late into the evening, when the police chief was forced to act because the situation was spiraling out of control. The protesters were suppressed early into the next day, and Hu asked Beijing to declare martial law on 8 March.

Hu's role in the demonstrations and rioting on 5 March was never made clear. While it is general protocol that Hu must have at least implicitly approved the use of force against protesters, whether he actually gave orders throughout 5 March is a matter of debate. In addition, John Tkacik cites that Hu had been coordinating with the Chengdu Military Region for troops to be on full alert as the situation progressed. Some diplomatic analysts linked what they saw as Hu's brutal use of force to the suppression of activists and students in Tiananmen Square, which took place three months later. Whether Hu provided "inspiration" for the PLA on 4 June is a matter of debate, but it was clear that Hu's actions in Lhasa earned him unprecedented attention in the upper echelons of party power, including by "paramount leader" Deng Xiaoping. When tanks rolled into Tiananmen Square, Hu was one of the first regional leaders to publicly declare his support for the central authorities.

Hu experienced high-altitude sickness in June 1990, and returned to Beijing, but remained in his position for another two years, during which he achieved little. His departure to Beijing was seen, however, simply as a pretext to return to the center of Chinese politics, which led to some doubts as to whether or not he was as ill as he had claimed. Martin Seiff of United Press International commented on Putin and Hu: "Both are tough and able authoritarians who had extensive experience of repressing dissent on their rise to the top."

Candidacy
Before the opening of the 14th National Congress of the CCP in 1992, senior party leaders, including Deng and Chen Yun, were to select candidates for the CCP Politburo Standing Committee (PSC) to ensure a smooth transition of power from the so-called second-generation leaders (Deng, Chen, Li Xiannian, Wang Zhen, etc.) to third-generation leaders (Jiang Zemin, Li Peng, Qiao Shi etc.). Deng also proposed considering another candidate for a further future transition, preferably someone under fifty to represent the next generation of leaders. Song Ping, as the organization chief, recommended Hu as an ideal candidate for the prospect of a future leader. As a result, shortly before his 50th birthday, Hu Jintao became the youngest (aged 49 in October 1992) member of the seven-member Politburo Standing Committee, and one of the youngest PSC members since the Communist Party assumed power in 1949.

In 1992, Hu took charge of the Secretariat of the Chinese Communist Party, which oversaw day-to-day operations of the CCP Central Committee, and the Central Party School, which was convenient for him to bring up his own supporters among senior CCP cadres. Hu was also put in charge of the ideological work of the CCP. Although Hu was considered heir apparent to Jiang, he always took great care to ensure that Jiang be at the center of the spotlight. In late 1998, Hu promoted Jiang's unpopular movement of the "Three Stresses" "stress study, stress politics, and stress healthy trends" giving speeches to promote it. In 2001, he publicized Jiang's Three Represents theory, which Jiang hoped to place himself on the same level as other Marxist theoreticians. In 1998, Hu became vice president, and Jiang wanted Hu to play a more active role in foreign affairs. Hu became China's leading voice during the NATO bombing of the Chinese embassy in Belgrade in 1999.

Leadership

Since taking over as general secretary of the Central Committee at the 16th National Congress of the Chinese Communist Party in 2002, Hu and his premier, Wen Jiabao, proposed to set up a Harmonious Socialist Society which aimed at lessening inequality and changing the style of the "GDP first and Welfare Second" policies. They focused on sectors of the Chinese population that had been left behind by the economic reform, and took a number of high-profile trips to the poorer areas of China with the stated goal of understanding these areas better. Hu and Wen Jiabao also attempted to move China away from a policy of favouring economic growth at all costs and toward a more balanced view of growth that includes factors in social inequality and environmental damage, including the use of the green gross domestic product in personnel decisions. Jiang's clique, however, maintained control in most developing areas; as a result, Hu and Wen's macroeconomic regulation measures faced great resistance. Hu was also mostly conservative on political reforms during his tenure.

SARS crisis
The first crisis of Hu's leadership happened during the outbreak of SARS in 2003. Following strong criticism of China for initially covering up and responding slowly to the crisis, he dismissed several party and government officials, including the health minister, who supported Jiang, and the Mayor of Beijing, Meng Xuenong, widely perceived as Hu's protégé.

Succession of Jiang Zemin

On 15 November 2002, a new Hu Jintao-led Politburo nominally succeeded Jiang, thus informally, had become the paramount leader. Although Jiang, then 76, stepped down from the powerful general secretary and the Politburo Standing Committee to make way for a younger leadership, there was speculation that Jiang would retain significant influence because Hu was not associated with Jiang's influential Shanghai clique, to which six out of the nine members of the all-powerful Standing Committee were believed to be linked. However, later developments show that many of its members had shifted their positions. Zeng Qinghong, for example, moved from a disciple of Jiang to serving as an intermediary between the two factions. In 2003, Jiang was also re-elected to the post of chairman of the Central Military Commission of the CCP. Thus, despite Hu Jintao taking over as the general secretary of the CCP, the chairman of the Central Military Commission was still the former CCP leader, Jiang Zemin.

Deng Xiaoping appointed three party General Secretaries, all designed to be successors, and was instrumental in the ousting of two of them, Hu Yaobang and Zhao Ziyang. His third and final selection, Jiang Zemin, won Deng's continued, although ambiguous, backing and was the only general secretary in Communist Chinese history to voluntarily leave his post when his term ended.

Jiang resigned as chairman of the Central Military Commission in September 2004, his last official post. Following Jiang's stepping-down, Hu had officially taken on the three institutions in the People's Republic of China where power lie, the party, the state, as well as the military.

Hu and premier Wen Jiabao inherited a China wrought with internal social, political and environmental problems. One of the biggest challenges Hu faced was the large wealth disparity between the Chinese rich and poor, for which discontent and anger mounted to a degree which wreaked havoc on the Communist Party's rule. Furthermore, the cronyism and corruption plaguing China's civil service, military, educational, judicial and medical systems threatened to destroy the country bit by bit. In the beginning of 2006, however, Hu launched the "8 Honours and 8 Shames" movement in a bid to promote a more selfless and moral outlook amongst the population.
At the 17th CCP National Congress, Hu was re-elected as general secretary of the Central Committee and chairman of the CCP Central Military Commission on 22 October 2007. At the 11th National People's Congress, Hu was re-elected as president on 15 March 2008. He was also re-elected as chairman of the PRC Central Military Commission.

Newsweek named Hu the second most powerful person in the world, referring to him as "the man behind the wheel of the world's most supercharged economy." Forbes also named him the second most powerful person in the world. Hu was named the 2010 World's Most Powerful Person by Forbes Magazine. Hu was listed four times (2008, 2007, 2005 and 2004) on the Time 100 annual list of most influential people.

Foreign policy 
Under Hu's leadership, China continued its style of developmental diplomacy which had been adopted under Deng Xiaoping and continued by Jiang Zemin. China's international behavior continued to be generally pragmatic and predictable. Hu pledged that China would seek peaceful development in a harmonious world to assure the international community that China's rise offered opportunities and benefits rather than conflicts. The key attributes of a harmonious world view of foreign policy are building and accepting a world where countries diverge in their paths of national development and political systems, coexistence of diverse civilizations, and rejected unilateralism and hegemonic ambitions.

In 2006, Hu articulated the four phases of China's foreign policy developmental objectives: (1) big powers were the key, (2) periphery countries the priority, (3) developing countries the foundation, and (4) multilateralism the stage.

In 2009, Chinese leader Hu Jintao called for a bolstered arms control agenda at the United Nations General Assembly, joining United States President Barack Obama's earlier calls for a nuclear-free world.

Throughout Hu's tenure, China's influence in Africa, Latin America, and other developing regions increased. He sought to develop China's relationship with Japan, which he visited in 2008. He downgraded relations with Russia because of unfulfilled deals.

Hu emphasized an international relations premise of "shared responsibility": China would contribute to global common good, but it must not adversely affect its core interests in doing so, and its commitments must be conditional to those of other nations. In the analysis of academic Suisheng Zhao, under Hu's leadership, "China remained a reluctant rising power and selectively took on global and regional obligations. Chinese foreign policy became omnidirectional, multilevel, and multidimensional."

Political positions

Scientific Outlook on Development

Political observers indicate that Hu distinguished himself from his predecessor in both domestic and foreign policy. Hu's political philosophy during his leadership is summarized by three slogans — a "Harmonious Socialist Society" domestically and "Peaceful Development" internationally, the former aided by the Scientific Development Concept, which seeks integrated sets of solutions to arrays of economic, environmental and social problems, and recognizes, in inner circles, a need for cautious and gradual political reforms. The Scientific Development doctrine was written into the Communist Party and State Constitutions in 2007 and 2008, respectively. The role of the Party has changed, as formulated by Deng Xiaoping and implemented by Jiang Zemin, from a revolutionary party to a ruling party. During his tenure he continued the Party's modernization, calling for both "Advancement" of the Party and its increasing transparency in governance.

What emerges from these philosophies, in Hu's view, is a country with a systematic approach to national structure and development that combines dynamic economic growth, a free market energized by a vigorous "nonpublic" (i.e., private) sector, heavy-handed political and media control, personal but not political freedoms, concern for the welfare of all citizens, cultural enlightenment, and a synergistic approach to diverse social issues (the Scientific Development Perspective) that lead, in Hu's vision, to a "Harmonious Socialist Society". In the view of the Chinese government, these philosophies, which have created a new "China Model" of governance, serve as a legitimate alternative to the West's "Democracy Model", particularly for developing countries. In Hu's words, "A Harmonious Socialist Society should feature democracy, the rule of law, equity, justice, sincerity, amity and vitality." Such a society, he says, will give full scope to people's talent and creativity, enable all the people to share the social wealth brought by reform and development, and forge an ever-closer relationship between the people and government. Hu even emphasized the potential of religious communities to contribute to economic and social development under the banner of "Building a Harmonious Socialist Society."

Western criticism of Hu, particularly regarding human rights, exposes his hypersensitivity to social stability but does not lay as much emphasis on his fresh commitment to address China's multi-faceted social problems. Hu's pragmatic, non-ideological agenda had two core values—maintaining social stability to further economic development and sustaining Chinese culture to enrich national sovereignty. In domestic policy, he seems to want more openness to the public on governmental functions and meetings. Recently, China's news agency published many Politburo Standing Committee meeting details. He also cancelled many events that are traditionally practiced, such as the lavish send-off and welcoming-back ceremonies of Chinese leaders when visiting foreign lands. Furthermore, the Chinese leadership under Hu also focused on such problems as the gap between rich and poor and uneven development between the interior and coastal regions. Both party and state seem to have moved away from a definition of development that focuses solely on GDP growth and toward a definition which includes social equality and environment effects.

In 2004, Hu gave an unprecedented showing and ordered all cadres from the five major power functions to stop the tradition of going to the Beidaihe seaside retreat for their annual summer meeting, which, before, was commonly seen as a gathering of ruling elites from both current and elder cadres to decide China's destiny, and also an unnecessary waste of public funds. The move was seen by the Chinese public as symbolic of Hu's attitude towards corruption.

In June 2007, Hu gave an important speech at the Central Party School that was indicative of his position of power and his guiding philosophies. In the speech Hu used a very populist tone to appeal to ordinary Chinese, making serious note of the recent challenges China was facing, especially with regards to income disparity. In addition, Hu noted the need for "increased democracy" in the country.

Taiwan
Early in his leadership, Hu faced a pro-independence counterpart in then ROC president Chen Shui-bian. Chen called for talks without any preconditions, repudiating the 1992 consensus. Chen Shui-bian and his party had continued to express an ultimate goal of de jure Taiwanese independence, and made statements on the political status of Taiwan that the PRC considers provocative. Hu's initial response was a combination of "soft" and "hard" approaches. On the one hand, Hu expressed a flexibility to negotiate on many issues of concern to Taiwan. On the other hand, he continued to refuse talks without preconditions and remained committed to Chinese unification as an ultimate goal. While Hu gave some signs of being more flexible with regard to political relationships with Taiwan as in his 17 May Statement, where he offered to address the issue of "international living space" for Taiwan, Hu's government remained firm in its position that the PRC would not tolerate any attempt by the Taiwanese government to declare de jure independence from China.

After Chen's re-election in 2004, Hu's government changed tactics, conducting a no-contact policy with Taiwan due to Chen and the DPP's independence leanings and repudiation of the 1992 consensus. The government maintained its military build-up against Taiwan, and pursued a vigorous policy of isolating Taiwan diplomatically. In March 2005, the Anti-Secession Law was passed by the National People's Congress, formalizing "non-peaceful means" as an option of response to a declaration of independence in Taiwan.

Hu's government increased contacts with the Kuomintang (KMT), its erstwhile foe in the Chinese Civil War, and still a major party in Taiwan. The increased contacts culminated in the 2005 Pan-Blue visits to mainland China, including a historic meeting between Hu and then-KMT chairman Lien Chan in April 2005. This was the first meeting between the leaders of the two parties since the conclusion of World War II.

On 20 March 2008, the Kuomintang under Ma Ying-jeou won the presidency in Taiwan, and a majority in the Legislative Yuan. Thereafter Hu immediately turned to a more 'soft' diplomatic approach and opened the way to a thaw in relations between the two sides. A series of historic meetings between the CCP and KMT have followed. On 12 April 2008, Hu Jintao met with Taiwan's vice president-elect Vincent Siew in the latter's role as chairman of the Cross-strait Common Market Foundation during the Boao Forum for Asia. On 28 May 2008, Hu met with KMT chairman Wu Poh-hsiung, the first meeting between the heads of the CCP and the KMT as ruling parties. During this meeting, Hu and Wu agreed that both sides should re-commence official dialogue under the 1992 consensus – that "both sides recognize there is only one China, but agree to differ on its definition." Wu committed the new government in Taiwan against Taiwanese independence; Hu committed his government to addressing the concerns of the Taiwanese people in regard to security, dignity, and "international living space", with a priority given to allowing Taiwan to participate in the World Health Organization.

In addition to the party-to-party dialogue, de facto governmental dialogue took place via the Straits Exchange Foundation and the Association for Relations Across the Taiwan Straits in June 2008 on the basis of the 1992 Consensus, with the first meeting held in Beijing. Both Hu and his new counterpart Ma Ying-jeou agreed that the 1992 Consensus is the basis for negotiations between the two sides of the Taiwan strait. On 26 March 2008, Hu Jintao held a telephone talk with then US president George W. Bush, in which he became the first Chinese leader to officially recognize the 1992 Consensus. After several months of negotiations, in December 2008, the two sides agreed on the resumption of the Three Links, i.e., a re-opening of mail, trade, and direct air links between the two sides. Relations continued to be cordial between the two sides during Hu's tenure, and trade increased immensely, culminating in the signing of the preferential trade agreement ECFA in 2010.

Moral guidance
In response to the great number of social problems in China, in March 2006, Hu Jintao released the "Eight Honors and Eight Shames" as a set of moral codes to be followed by the Chinese people, and emphasized the need to spread the message to the youth. Alternatively known as the "Eight Honors and Disgraces", it contained eight poetic lines which summarized what a good citizen should regard as an honor and what to regard as a shame. It has been widely regarded as one of Hu Jintao's ideological solutions to the perceived increasing lack of morality in China after Chinese economic reforms brought in a generation of Chinese predominantly concerned with earning money and power in an increasingly frail social fabric.

It has become a norm for Chinese communist leaders to make their own contributions to Marxist-Leninist theory. Whether this is Hu's contribution to Marxist-Leninist theory is debatable, but its general reception with the Chinese public has been moderate. Its promotion, however, is visible almost everywhere: in classroom posters, banners on the street, and electronic display boards for the preparation of the 2008 Olympics, and World Expo 2010 in Shanghai. The codes differ from the ideologies of his predecessors, namely, Jiang's Three Represents, Deng Xiaoping Theory, and Mao Zedong Thought in that the focus, for the first time, has been shifted to codifying moral standards as opposed to setting social or economic goals.

Legacy
Hu presided over a decade of consistent economic growth, led China through the storm of the global financial crisis relatively unscathed, and increased China's international stature immensely. Hu's achievements included modernizing China's infrastructure, launching China's first manned space probe, and sponsoring two successful international events: the 2008 Beijing Olympics and the 2010 Shanghai Expo. In addition, Hu's "soft approach" to Taiwan, coinciding with the election of a Kuomintang government in Taipei, improved the relationship between mainland China and Taiwan. Trade and contact between the two sides increased significantly during Hu's tenure. In addition, Hu and premier Wen Jiabao's populist policies have resulted in the elimination of agricultural taxes for farmers, more flexible policies towards migrant workers living in cities, more balanced development between the coastal regions and the hinterlands, enforcing minimum wage in cities and the promotion of sustainable and affordable housing developments. The response to the SARS public health crisis and the massive expansion of health insurance coverage for middle- to low-income citizens earned Hu accolades domestically. Generally speaking, these policies have been well received by the Chinese public.

In foreign policy, Hu's critics say that his government was overly aggressive in asserting its new power, overestimated its reach, and raised the ire and apprehension of various neighbours, including Southeast Asian countries, India, and Japan. Such policies are also said to be provocative towards the United States. Domestic critics, including the country's elites, intellectuals, and particularly dissidents, point to various shortcomings of the Hu administration and his failure in implementing his signature "Socialist Harmonious Society" policy. They cite, for example, that China's internal security budget exceeded its military budget during Hu's tenure as protests and other 'mass incidents' continued to increase across the country. China's Gini coefficient climbed to 0.47 by 2010, indicating a potentially unsustainable gap between the rich and the poor. The Hu administration's inability to rein in the wealth gap and its renewed emphasis on the role of state-owned enterprises in the economy led some economists to believe that Hu missed a critical opportunity for reform and structural adjustment.

Hu's tough-on-corruption policies saw mixed results. While there were some attempts to increase transparency in the expenditures of official organs and bureaucrats, deeply entrenched systemic issues that were contributing to the growth of corruption remained unresolved. In addition, the massive corruption scandal that ensnared the military shortly after Hu's departure from office showed that Hu was unable to tackle entrenched interests in the military. In his own departing speech at the 18th Party Congress, Hu emphasized the potentially devastating effects that unchecked corruption would have on the party and the country. Moreover, the Hu administration's insistence on censorship and the curtailing of freedom of speech drew extensive criticism from human rights organizations and Western governments, while artists and writers inside the country chided increased restrictions on cultural expressions during Hu's term. Although in the early years of his tenure Hu attempted to pioneer a form of "intraparty democracy" that called for greater participation from lower-ranked members to determine policy and select the leadership, there was little evidence of meaningful changes to the party's governing structure and decision-making process.

Consensus-based decision-making became a hallmark of the Hu era. Hu was never a strongman, did not rule by fist, and was often seen as first-among-equals with his Politburo Standing Committee colleagues. Some called China's political landscape during Hu's era one of "nine dragons taming the water", that is, nine PSC members each ruling over their own fief. In addition, Hu not only faced a profusion of special interest groups and political factions within the party, his ability to implement a cohesive program was also constrained by the influence of former leader Jiang Zemin. Consequently, there is debate on how much power Hu held personally to effect change. Nevertheless, within the context of the system he was placed in, Hu was credited for being an effective mediator and consensus-builder. Hu also won praise for stepping down as military chief in favour of his successor Xi Jinping at the same time relinquishing his position as general secretary. This was seen as a message to the establishment and Jiang Zemin that elders should retire according to protocol and avoid meddling in the affairs of their successors.

After retirement

20th Communist Party Congress 

At the 20th Communist Party Congress closing ceremony on 22 October 2022 in the Great Hall of the People in Beijing, Hu Jintao, who had been sitting next to incumbent Party general secretary Xi Jinping, was removed from his chair by two men in suits and name badges and "inexplicably led out of the hall". According to Agence France-Presse and Wall Street Journal journalists, Hu "initially seemed reluctant to leave." Xi Jinping appeared wholly unconcerned but Li Zhanshu and Wang Huning, both sitting to Hu's left, appeared visibly concerned. Li Zhanshu attempted to help him until being pulled back by Wang Huning. Hu nudged and whispered to Xi, and gave a pat on the back of Premier Li Keqiang before being led away. None of Politburo members seated at the front row showed any visible reaction to Hu's removal.

Channel NewsAsia, Singapore's national public broadcaster service, released a video on 24 October that documented what happened before Hu Jintao left. The video shows Hu Jintao holding official documents next to his red ballot folder before Li Zhanshu takes the documents from Hu and covers them with Hu's ballot folder whilst whispering to him. Li then stops Hu from trying to retrieve the documents, with Wang Huning waving his hand to Hu. Xi Jinping, who has been monitoring this event, calls for the staff and Hu Jintao is soon escorted out.

This incident occurred before the congressional voting on the report of the 19th Central Committee, the work report of the 19th Central Commission for Discipline Inspection, and an amendment to the Party Constitution. Hu was absent from the voting due to this incident. Subsequent official voting results showed that all proposals passed unanimously with no abstentions or negative votes. The 20th Central Committee was also elected on the same day; Xi Jinping and Wang Huning were among the members of the new Central Committee while Li Keqiang and Li Zhanshu were not.

Xinhua News Agency, China's official press agency, stated on its English-language Twitter account that "When [Hu] was not feeling well during the session, his staff, for his health, accompanied him to a room next to the meeting venue for a rest. Now, he is much better."

Before Channel NewsAsia released the second video documenting what happened before, there were many commentaries on the first video recording. James Palmer, a deputy editor at Foreign Policy, interpreted the incident to have been political, suggesting that it could have been Xi's intention to "deliberately and publicly humiliate his predecessor." Xi had been harshly critical in his previous speeches, where he spoke of "the problem that the party's leadership had been weakened, blurred, diluted, and marginalized" before his leadership. The Economist said that while it is possible the act was deliberate, it was more likely that Hu was not feeling well, saying that the event "looked consistent with a sudden episode of mental confusion". Jude Blanchette, an expert at the Center for Strategic and International Studies, said that the event "didn't have the stage-managed feel of an orchestrated purge", while Bill Bishop, a China expert, noted that the China Central Television would likely never show Hu during the news footage of the event if he was purged.

Jiang Zemin's funeral 
Following the death of his predecessor Jiang Zemin, Hu was appointed to serve on the  funeral committee, ranked 36th on the list out of over 700 names. Though this appointment was merely a formality and despite being ranked lower on the list (along with some of his former colleagues), this confirmed  that Hu was not purged.

Hu Jintao appeared in public alongside Xi Jinping on 5 December 2022, attending the farewell ceremony before Jiang's body was cremated in Babaoshan Revolutionary Cemetery. He was accompanied by an aide.

Awards and honors
 Colombia:
 Grand Cross of the National Order of Merit (21 January 1997)
 Cuba:
 Member of the Order of José Martí (23 November 2004)
 Jordan:
 Grand Cordon of the Supreme Order of the Renaissance (14 January 2001)
 Madagascar:
 Grand Cordon of the National Order of Madagascar (25 January 1999)
 Pakistan:
 Recipient of the Nishan-e-Pakistan (24 November 2006)
 Peru:
 Grand Cross of Order of the Sun of Peru (19 November 2008)
 Turkmenistan:
 Member of the Order of Saparmurat Türkmenbaşy the Great (29 August 2008)
 Ukraine:
 Member 1st Class of the Order of Prince Yaroslav the Wise (31 August 2010)

See also

 History of the People's Republic of China (2002–present)
 Hu–Wen Administration

Notes

References

Citations

Works cited

 Ewing, Richard Daniel. "Hu Jintao: The Making of a Chinese General Secretary." China Quarterly 173 (2003): 17–34. online 
 Lam, Willy. Chinese politics in the Hu Jintao era: New leaders, new challenges (Routledge, 2016).
 Miller, Alice. "Hu Jintao and the Sixth Plenum". China Leadership Monitor 20 (2007): 1–12. online

 Xing, Guoxin. "Hu Jintao's Political Thinking and Legitimacy Building: A Post-Marxist Perspective". Asian Affairs 36.4 (2009): 213–226. online

Further reading
 Bo, Zhiyue. "Hu Jintao and the CCP's ideology: A historical perspective". Journal of Chinese Political Science 9.2 (2004): 27–45. online
 Cabestan, Jean-Pierre. "China's foreign-and security-policy decision-making processes under Hu Jintao." Journal of Current Chinese Affairs 38.3 (2009): 63–97. online
 Chai, Winberg. "The ideological paradigm shifts of China's world views: From Marxism-Leninism-Maoism to the pragmatism-multilateralism of the Deng-Jiang-Hu era". Asian Affairs 30.3 (2003): 163–175.
 Cheng, Tun-Jen, et al. eds. China Under Hu Jintao: Opportunities, Dangers, and Dilemmas (2005)
 David, Daniel K. Modern World Leaders: Hu Jintao (Chelsea, 2008)
 Ding, Yijiang. "Consolidation of the PRC's leadership succession system from Hu Jintao to Xi Jinping". China Report 51.1 (2015): 49–65.
 Fewsmith, Joseph. "China under Hu Jintao". China Leadership Monitor 14 (Spring 2005) online.
 Fu, Diana, and Greg Distelhorst. "Grassroots participation and repression under Hu Jintao and Xi Jinping." China Journal 79.1 (2018): 100–122. online
 Garver, John W. China's Quest: The History of the Foreign Relations of the People's Republic of China (2016)
 Holbig, Heike. "Remaking the CCP's ideology: Determinants, progress, and limits under Hu Jintao." Critical Readings on the Communist Party of China (4 Vols. Brill, 2017). pp 773–796. online
 Mulvenon, James C. "Hu Jintao and the 'Core Values of Military Personnel. China Leadership Monitor 28 (2009): 1-8. online
 Narayanan, Raviprasad. "Stability with Chinese Characteristics: Hu Jintao's Taiwan Policy".China Report 49.4 (2013): 413–424.
 Zheng, Yongnian, and Sow Keat Tok. "Harmonious society and harmonious world: China's policy discourse under Hu Jintao." Briefing Series 26 (2007): 1–12. online

External links

 Hu Jintao (ChinaVitae.com)
 Hu Jintao calls for upholding Marxism (Xinhua)
 Hu Jintao's political philosophies and policies by Dr. Robert Lawrence Kuhn
 China's leader shows his stripes 2005 BBC article arguing Hu more hardline than he initially appeared
 Requiem for Reform? Zhao Ziyang's vision of political change in China dims as Hu Jintao hardens the Party line (Time Asia)

 
1942 births
Living people
 
20th-century Chinese politicians
21st-century Chinese politicians
Chinese Communist Party politicians from Jiangsu
Delegates to the 16th National Congress of the Chinese Communist Party
Delegates to the 17th National Congress of the Chinese Communist Party
Delegates to the 7th National People's Congress
Delegates to the 8th National People's Congress
Delegates to the 9th National People's Congress
Delegates to the 10th National People's Congress
Delegates to the 11th National People's Congress
Engineers from Jiangsu
First Secretaries of the Communist Youth League of China
Foreign recipients of the Nishan-e-Pakistan
General Secretaries and Chairmen of the Chinese Communist Party
Grand Crosses of the Order of the Sun of Peru
Members of the 12th Central Committee of the Chinese Communist Party
Members of the 13th Central Committee of the Chinese Communist Party
Members of the 14th Politburo Standing Committee of the Chinese Communist Party
Members of the 15th Politburo Standing Committee of the Chinese Communist Party
Members of the 16th Politburo Standing Committee of the Chinese Communist Party
Members of the 17th Politburo Standing Committee of the Chinese Communist Party
People's Republic of China politicians from Jiangsu
Political office-holders in Guizhou
Political office-holders in Tibet
Politicians from Taizhou, Jiangsu
Presidents of the People's Republic of China
Recipients of the Order of Prince Yaroslav the Wise, 1st class
Recipients of the Order of the Sun of Peru
Tsinghua University alumni
Tuanpai
Vice presidents of the People's Republic of China
Recipients of orders, decorations, and medals of Madagascar